Robert Lucien Wokler (6 December 1942 – 30 July 2006) was a British historian who was a leading scholar of the political thought of the Enlightenment.

References 

 https://www.jstor.org/stable/26222117
 https://www.thetimes.co.uk/article/robert-wokler-tkzt6gbdfvn
 https://www.theguardian.com/news/2006/aug/23/guardianobituaries.obituaries

Deaths from cancer in the United Kingdom
2006 deaths
University of Chicago alumni
Alumni of the London School of Economics
Alumni of Nuffield College, Oxford
Fellows of Magdalen College, Oxford
Academics of the University of Reading
Academics of the Victoria University of Manchester
Fellows of Sidney Sussex College, Cambridge
Fellows of Trinity College, Cambridge
Refugees in the United Kingdom
Holocaust survivors
Intellectual historians
20th-century British historians
21st-century British historians
Historians of political thought
Rousseau scholars
British political philosophers